John Paul Wehner (pronounced "Way-ner") (born June 29, 1967) is an American former utility player in Major League Baseball (MLB) and a current broadcaster for the Pittsburgh Pirates. His nickname is "Rock".

Career
A Pittsburgh native and graduate of Carrick High School, Wehner was drafted out of Indiana University by the Pirates in the 7th round of the 1988 MLB draft and made his MLB debut on July 17, 1991. He was in the Pirates' organization, splitting his time between MLB and their minor league affiliates, through the 1996 season. In 1997 he joined the Florida Marlins as a bench player, staying there for two seasons before rejoining the Pirates in 1999.

He retired from playing in 2001.  He is known for hitting the final home run (in the bottom of the 5th), and also grounding into the final out in the history of Three Rivers Stadium, both on 10-1-2000.  In 11 seasons in MLB, Wehner compiled a .249 batting average with four home runs and 54 RBI in 461 games. He played every position except pitcher at least 3 times. He also shares the  MLB record of 99 consecutive errorless games at third base with Jeff Cirillo and has a World Series ring with the Florida Marlins for the 1997 season.

Broadcasting
After retiring from playing, Wehner took a job as hitting coach for the Altoona Curve, a Pirates minor league affiliate, and held that position from 2002 through 2004. In 2005 he began working as a color commentator for AT&T SportsNet Pittsburgh and the Pirates Radio Network.

See also
Pittsburgh Pirates broadcasters and media

References

External links

MLB.com
Retrosheet
The Baseball Gauge
Venezuela Winter League

1967 births
Living people
Altoona Curve players
American expatriate baseball players in Canada
Baseball coaches from Pennsylvania
Baseball players from Pittsburgh
Buffalo Bisons (minor league) players
Calgary Cannons players
Carolina Mudcats players
Charlotte Knights players
Florida Marlins players
Harrisburg Senators players
Indiana Hoosiers baseball players
Leones del Caracas players
American expatriate baseball players in Venezuela
Major League Baseball outfielders
Major League Baseball third basemen
Minor league baseball coaches
Nashville Sounds players
Pittsburgh Pirates announcers
Pittsburgh Pirates players
Salem Buccaneers players
Sportspeople from Pittsburgh
Watertown Pirates players